Cala di Volpe is a bay and small community located in Arzachena in the province of Sassari, in north-east Sardinia. It lies in the historical and geographical region known as Gallura on the Costa Smeralda. Cala di Volpe is located between the broad beach of Juncu and Capriccioli . The town has a natural harbour.

The bay is also famous for its namesake luxury hotel designed by Jacques Couelle and the superpanfili arriving in summer that dock on buoys, which are located in the south cove. Cala di Volpe has a small wooden pier.

Some scenes from the James Bond film The Spy Who Loved Me were filmed in this resort town.

Cities and towns in Sardinia
1922 establishments in Italy
States and territories established in 1922
Sardinia